Benjamin Franklin Rice (May 26, 1828 – January 19, 1905) was a Republican politician from Arkansas, among several states, who represented that state in the United States Senate during the Reconstruction years from 1868 to 1873.

Biography
Rice was born in East Otto in Cattaraugus County in southwestern New York. After private schooling, Rice studied law, and upon his admission to the bar began practice in Irvine in Estill County in east-central Kentucky. From 1855 to 1856, he was a member of the Kentucky House of Representatives.  In 1856, he served as a presidential elector for the Republican ticket pledged to John C. Fremont. In 1860, he relocated to Minnesota and soon joined the Union Army Union as a captain during the American Civil War. Eventually, he gained promotion to the rank of major and was a  judge advocate with the 3rd Minnesota Volunteer Infantry Regiment.

In 1864, Rice settled in the capital city of Little Rock, Arkansas, where he resumed his law practice. He was active in organizing the Arkansas Republican Party and was appointed the chair of a committee which in 1868 prepared the state's code of practice.  Upon the readmission of Arkansas to the Union, Rice was elected by the Arkansas General Assembly to the Senate. At one point, he held the chairmanship of the Committee on Mines and Mining, now the Committee on Energy and Natural Resources.

On returning home, Rice resumed his law practice. In 1875, he moved to Colorado for health reasons. He then returned to Washington, D.C. in 1882, where he continued his law practice until his death.  He died in Tulsa, Oklahoma, and is interred there at Oak Hill Cemetery in Washington, D.C.

References

 Retrieved on March 24, 2009

1828 births
1905 deaths
People from Cattaraugus County, New York
People from Estill County, Kentucky
Members of the Kentucky House of Representatives
People from Washington, D.C.
Republican Party United States senators from Arkansas
Arkansas Republicans
People of Minnesota in the American Civil War
Politicians from Little Rock, Arkansas
Burials in Oklahoma
19th-century American politicians
Burials at Oak Hill Cemetery (Washington, D.C.)